Jittery may refer to:
 Jittery Jester is the 88th animated cartoon short subject in the Woody Woodpecker series
 Jittery Joe's is a chain of coffee houses based in Athens, Georgia
 Live at Jittery Joe's was an album released in 2001 by Jeff Mangum of Neutral Milk Hotel to battle the high prices of bootlegs on eBay
 Jittery Joe's (cycling team) (UCI Code: JIT) is a UCI Continental team consisting of professional and amateur riders that compete primarily in USA Cycling Professional Tour and UCI America Tour road bicycle racing events